Age Discrimination Act may refer to

Age Discrimination Act 2004, Australia
Age Discrimination in Employment Act of 1967, United States